The Italian general election of 1987 took place on 14 June 1987.

Christian Democracy was by far the largest party in Sardinia. The Sardinian Action Party had its best result in a general election, gaining two deputies and one senator.

Results

Chamber of Deputies

Source: Ministry of the Interior

Senate

Source: Ministry of the Interior

Elections in Sardinia
1987 elections in Italy
June 1987 events in Europe